Darah Gerdaleh (also Romanized as Dārah Gardaleh; also known as Dār Gerdaleh and Dār Gerdāleh) is a village in Il Teymur Rural District, in the Central District of Bukan County, West Azerbaijan Province, Iran. At the 2006 census, its population was 140, in 26 families.

References 

Populated places in Bukan County